Wannes Van Tricht (born 13 November 1993) is a Belgian footballer who currently plays for FC Lebbeke.

External links

1993 births
Living people
Belgian footballers
Belgium under-21 international footballers
Belgium youth international footballers
Belgian Pro League players
Challenger Pro League players
K.V. Mechelen players
K.F.C. Verbroedering Geel players
K. Rupel Boom F.C. players
S.C. Eendracht Aalst players
F.C.V. Dender E.H. players
Footballers from Flemish Brabant

Association football midfielders
Sportspeople from Leuven